The Eastern Indonesia Malay is a language family Malay-based creole spoken by various ethnic groups in the Eastern Indonesia Region. This language is used as lingua franca by residents in cities and ports in Eastern Indonesia. One example of East Indonesian Malay that is widely used is Ambonese Malay; This language is spoken in the southern Maluku Islands especially Ambon Island and around.

Classification
According to the Glottolog (2022) and Ethnologue classifications, Eastern Indonesia Malay consists of several languages. According to the classification of glottologists, this language is divided into several types of dialects, which are divided as follows.

Eastern Indonesia Malay
Ambonese Malay
 Dobo
 Masohi
Dutch Ambonese Malay
Banda Malay
Dili Malay
Kampung Alor
Gorontalo Malay
Kupang Malay
Air Mata
Alor Malay
Larantuka Malay
Makassar Malay ?
North Moluccan Malay
Bacanese Malay
Gorap
Sula Malay
Ternate Malay
Manado Malay
Bitung
Bunaken
Papuan Malay
Sorong Malay
Serui Malay
Vanimo

Notes

References

External links
 Ethnologue: Malay-based creoles

Languages of Indonesia